Dabney Cosby (September 23, 1879 – May 15, 1956) was an American Democratic politician who served as a member of the Virginia House of Delegates, representing Goochland and his native Fluvanna County.

References

External links 

1879 births
1956 deaths
Democratic Party members of the Virginia House of Delegates
20th-century American politicians